Maksim Anatolyevich Sazonov (born 2 April 2000) is a Russian football player. He plays for FC Metallurg Lipetsk.

Club career
He made his debut in the Russian Football National League for FC Spartak-2 Moscow on 20 April 2019 in a game against FC Mordovia Saransk.

References

External links
 Profile by Russian Football National League
 
 

2000 births
People from Yelets
Living people
Russian footballers
Russia youth international footballers
Association football defenders
FC Spartak-2 Moscow players
FC Metallurg Lipetsk players
Sportspeople from Lipetsk Oblast